Andrea Pisani (Venice, 1662 – Corfu, 21 September 1718) was a Venetian noble who served as Captain General of the Sea during the Seventh Ottoman–Venetian War.

Biography
Andrea Pisani was born in Venice in 1662, to a noble family belonging to the Venetian patriciate. He was the son of Gianfrancesco Pisani and Paolina Contarini.

In order to redeem himself, he enlisted as a volunteer in the Imperial army operating in Hungary during the Siege of Buda. In the next year, he returned to Venice, enlisting in the Venetian navy under the captain (Governator di Nave) Pietro Zaguri.

In 1693, he was appointed paymaster under the Doge and Captain General of the Sea Francesco Morosini. In 1695, he took part in the naval Battle of the Oinousses Islands, under the command of Captain General  against the Ottoman fleet, and in the next year he fought in the Battle of Andros under Captain General .

On his return to Venice he was elected to the Venetian Senate. As senator, he occupied several different magistratures, until returning to military duties in 1715, with the outbreak of the Seventh Ottoman–Venetian War, when he was appointed Provveditore Generale delle Isole, and later Captain General of the Sea. In 1716, he participated in the successful defence of Corfu, and recaptured Butrint and Santa Maura.

In 1717, he distinguished himself in the battle off Passavas, along with his brother : aboard a small felucca, Pisani passed through the enemy ships in full action, reorganized his own ships of the line, and encouraged his troops. Once back in Santa Maura, he busied himself with its re-fortification, alongside Count Johann Matthias von der Schulenburg.

In 1718, he was besieging Dulcigno when news arrived of the Treaty of Passarowitz. He lifted the siege and returned with the fleet to Corfu. On 21 September 1718 he was killed in an explosion caused when a thunderbolt struck a gunpowder magazine. His body was transported to Venice, where his funeral took place; he was buried in the island of La Certosa.

Footnotes

References

Sources

1662 births
1718 deaths
Andrea
Republic of Venice admirals
Republic of Venice people of the Ottoman–Venetian Wars
People of the Great Turkish War